Puritan Reformed Theological Seminary (Puritan Reformed) is a Protestant Reformed seminary located in Grand Rapids, Michigan. The seminary started in 1995 as a school of the Heritage Reformed Congregations, a church association that originated in 1993 from the Netherlands Reformed Congregations. Founded in 1995, PRTS is a graduate school. All of its faculty subscribe the Three Forms of Unity and the Westminster Standards. The current president of Puritan Reformed is Dr. Joel R Beeke.

Because the Heritage Reformed Congregations work closely with the Free Reformed Churches of North America (FRC), the latter also supports the Puritan Reformed. Since 1998, the Puritan Reformed has also been the official training of the FRC, the sister churches of the Dutch Christian Reformed Churches.

International Campuses
Apart from main campus, Puritan Reformed has also 5 global extension campuses in Africa (Pretoria, South Africa), Asia (Taipei, Taiwan), Europe (London, United Kingdom), Middle East(Cairo, Egypt) and South America (São José dos Campos – SP, Brazil).

Accreditation
The state of Michigan has granted Puritan Reformed a degree-granting charter and has approved all of their current degree offerings. Puritan Reformed currently offers six accredited degrees: the Master of Divinity (M.Div.), Master of Arts in Religion (MA), Master of Arts in Biblical Counseling (MABC), Master of Theology (Th.M.), Doctor of Ministry (DMin), and Doctor of Philosophy (Ph.D.).

In February 2014, Puritan Reformed became accredited by the Association of Theological Schools in the United States and Canada.

The Master of Theology (ThM) degree program is also approved at the following five extension sites: Alexandria Governorate-Cairo Governorate in Egypt, London in United Kingdom, Sao Jose dos Campos, SP in Brazil, Taipei City in Taiwan, Pretoria in South Africa.

Research Centers
The Puritan Research Center is started in cooperation with the Theological University of Apeldoorn to set up an associated combined doctoral program and to encourage research in Puritan related studies.

The Jonathan Edwards Center at Puritan Reformed is part of international network centers dedicated to research, education, and publication on Jonathan Edwards and his context. The first Jonathan Edwards Center began at Yale University, and subsequently many such centers were planted in six continents. It was announced during the International Jonathan Edwards Conference at Yale University, on October 4, 2019, that Edwards Center-Midwest would be moving to Puritan Reformed.

The Center for Classical Reformed Systematic Theology  is established in cooperation with the :nl:Hersteld Hervormd Seminarie part of Vrije Universiteit Amsterdam for post doctoral research into Reformed systematic theology.

The Geerhardus Vos Center is established at Puritan Reformed for the advancement and dissemination of research that advances the interrelationship of exegetical, biblical, and systematic theology in the context of broadly Reformed epistemology.

References

External links
 

Seminaries and theological colleges in Michigan
Reformed church seminaries and theological colleges in the United States
Education in Grand Rapids, Michigan
Educational institutions established in 1995
Universities and colleges in Kent County, Michigan
1995 establishments in Michigan